Vuelta is the sixth album by singer-songwriter Richard Shindell, recorded largely in collaboration with Puente Celeste, in Buenos Aires, Argentina.

Track listing 
All songs written by Richard Shindell except where indicated.
 "Fenario" (final verse taken from "Break of Day" by John Donne) – 5:18 
 "Waist Deep in the Big Muddy" (Pete Seeger) – 4:29 
 "The Island" – 4:07 
 "Hazel's House" – 3:20 
 "Che Guevara T-Shirt" – 5:27 
 "Canción Sencilla" – 4:16 
 "There Goes Mavis" – 5:54 
 "So Says the Whippoorwill" – 4:37 
 "The Last Fare of the Day" – 4:52 
 "Gray Green" – 3:52

Personnel
 Pablo Acedo – Engineer 
 Alejandro Franov – Piano, Accordion, Sitar, Fender Rhodes, Group Member 
 Mark Frethem – Mastering 
 David Glasser – Mastering 
 Tracy Grammer – Violin 
 Lucy Kaplansky –  Harmony 
 Mariano Lopez – Engineer, Mixing 
 Radoslav Lorković – Chimes 
 Ricardo Maril – Assistant 
 Dennis McDermott – Percussion, Drums 
 John Putnam Pedal Steel, engineer 
 Lincoln Schleifer – Bass (Electric), Harmonium, engineer, Mixing 
 Richard Shindell – Guitar (Acoustic), Guitar (Electric), Vocals, producer 
 Mark Spector – Management 
 David Wilkes – Product Manager

Tour 
Shindell promoted Veulta with a 2004 national US tour.
 9/23 San Diego, CA at Acoustic Music
 9/24 Santa Barbara, CA at SOHO
 9/25 Santa Monica, CA at McCabes
 9/26-27 Berkeley, CA at Freight & Salvage
 9/29 Winters, CA at The Palms
 10/22 Montclair, NJ at Outpost in the Burbs
 10/23 Somerville, MA at Somerville Theater
 10/24 Waitsfield, VT at Valley Players Theater
 10/27-28 Northfield, MA at Iron Horse
 10/29 Londonderry, NH at Tupelo Music Hall
 10/30 Huntington, NY at IMAC
 11/1 Charlottesville, VA at Gravity Lounge
 11/3 Charlotte, NC at Evening Muse
 11/4 Asheville, NC at Grey Eagle
 11/5 Atlanta, GA at Red Light Café
 11/10 Cincinnati, OH at Emerald Ballroom
 11/11 Ann Arbor, MI at The Arc
 11/12 Chicago, IL at Old Town School
 11/17 Cleveland, OH at Beachland Ballroom
 11/19-20 New York, NY at Joe's Pub
 11/ 21 Philadelphia, PA at World Café Live

Notes and references

External links 
 Vuelta page at richardshindell.com (links to lyrics, samples, and purchase)
 Richard Shindell/Vuelta page at Koch Records
 [ Vuelta] at the Allmusic

2004 albums
Richard Shindell albums